Alabaster Box is the fourth studio album by American singer CeCe Winans. It was released by WellSpring Gospel on October 19, 1999 in the United States. Her debut release on WellSpring, her own label, Winans described Alabaster Box as an "experimental" album for the label before any new artists were signed. It did very well on the charts and included a duet with Take 6. Gospel artist Fred Hammond also took a production turn on the album.

Critical reception

Allmusic editor Steve Huey found that Alabaster Box "is a return to [Winan's] gospel roots, in contrast to the straight-ahead urban soul of Everlasting Love, and it's a triumphant one. Winans sounds invigorated by the spiritual material, delivering committed performances and commanding vocals. The production sounds very contemporary, if a little slick at times, but that's not likely to bother most fans. Alabaster Box is an excellent album from a terrific talent."

Track listing

Charts

Certifications

References

CeCe Winans albums
1999 albums